A county executive, county manager or county mayor is the head of the executive branch of government in a United States county.

The executive may be an elected or an appointed position. When elected, the executive typically functions either as a voting member of the elected county government, or may have veto power similar to other elected executives such as a governor, president or mayor. When appointed, the executive is usually hired for a specific period of time, but frequently can be dismissed prior to this. The position of an appointed county executive is analogous to that of a city manager (rather than that of an appointed governor common outside the U.S.), and is similar to a chief administrative officer, depending on the state. The executive is generally given full responsibility for the total operation of all departments based on general directives provided by the elected county government that hired the executive.

States with county executives
The title for a person holding this position is "County Executive" in many states but other titles are used, including "County Judge" (in Arkansas and Texas, and historically in Missouri and Tennessee), "County Judge/Executive" in Kentucky, and "Mayor" in some counties, and "County Mayor" in Hawaii and Tennessee.

See also
County commission
Borough president

References

 
Executives
Government occupations